Trochoidea cumiae  is a species of air-breathing land snail, a terrestrial pulmonate gastropod mollusk in the family Geomitridae, the hairy snails and their allies.

Distribution

This species is endemic to Lampedusa, Italy.

References

 Calcara, P. (1847). Descrizione dell'isola di Lampedusa, 1-45. Palermo. (Pagano).
 Bank, R. A.; Neubert, E. (2017). Checklist of the land and freshwater Gastropoda of Europe. Last update: July 16, 2017

External links
 Pfeiffer, L. (1849). Nachträge zu L. Pfeiffer Monographia Heliceorum. Zeitschrift für Malakozoologie. Cassel (Theodor Fischer). 6 (4): 66-79

Trochoidea (genus)
Molluscs of Europe
Endemic fauna of Italy
Gastropods described in 1847